Mount Aventine is a farm complex and national historic district located along the Potomac River in Bryans Road, Charles County, Maryland. The complex includes the main house; a second-quarter 19th century Greek Revival-influenced brick house.  It was enlarged about 1860 to its present five-bay, center-passage, -story appearance. Also on the property are a 19th-century frame smokehouse, the site of another 19th-century house complex, late-19th /early-20th-century agricultural outbuildings, house and dairy barn complex built about 1900, historic roadbeds, a family cemetery, and sites of a 19th-century fishery and an 18th-century house.

Its former cupola was used as a signal station by the Federal government during the American Civil War.  The Chapman family owned the Mt. Aventine tract from 1751 until 1916, and the ferry operated by them was one of several important crossings of the Potomac River connecting Northern Virginia to Maryland.

It was added to the National Register of Historic Places in 1996, and since 1998 has been preserved as part of Chapman State Park.

The house is open for tours during special events hosted by the Friends of Chapman State Park.

Gallery

References

External links
Chapman State Park Maryland Department of Natural Resources
Friends of Chapman State Park
, including photo from 1991, at Maryland Historical Trust

Historic districts in Charles County, Maryland
Farms on the National Register of Historic Places in Maryland
Greek Revival houses in Maryland
Houses in Charles County, Maryland
Museums in Charles County, Maryland
Historic house museums in Maryland
Historic districts on the National Register of Historic Places in Maryland
National Register of Historic Places in Charles County, Maryland